Damir Voloder (born November 20, 1959) is a Croatian professional basketball coach and former player.

References

1959 births
Living people
Croatian basketball coaches
Croatian men's basketball players
Sportspeople from Vukovar
Point guards
KK MZT Skopje players
KK Vrijednosnice Osijek coaches